Leo Biasiucci is an American politician and a current Republican member of the Arizona House of Representatives representing District 30 since 2023. He previously represented District 5 in the Arizona House of Representatives from 2019 to 2023, before redistrcting. Leo Biasiucci was elected in 2018 to succeed embattled State Representative Paul Mosley. Leo Biasiucci defeated Mosley in the Republican primary, and went on to win the general election in November 2018.

In 2016, Biasiucci ran for the Arizona House as a progressive Green Party candidate. Two years later he explained to a reporter that he "didn't understand where his beliefs were" in relation to political parties before he switched to the Republican Party in 2018. He said he still holds the non-partisan position that we all need to 'protect the planet.' 

Leo Biasiucci attended the University of Arizona and worked for companies such as General Electric and Geico. He has also appeared as a cameo actor in several TV series and movies before becoming involved with his family's business, the Mohave Traffic Survival School.

Two bills that were introduced by Leo Biasiucci and signed into law were the 2nd Amendment Firearm Freedom Act (HB2111) and Child Sex Crimes (HB2889). HB2111 makes Arizona a 2nd Amendment Sanctuary State. HB2889 adds mandatory sentencing, including life in prison without parole, for child sex crimes and trafficking.

References

21st-century American politicians
American politicians of Mexican descent
Living people
People from Lake Havasu City, Arizona
Republican Party members of the Arizona House of Representatives
Year of birth missing (living people)